The Men's discus throw THS2 was a field event in athletics at the 1992 Summer Paralympics, for athletes with missing limbs.

Results

Final

References 

Men's discus throw THS2